Pointe-Calumet is a municipality in the Canadian province of Quebec. The municipality is located within the Deux-Montagnes Regional County Municipality in the Laurentides region. It is situated about 30 minutes northwest of Montreal. Its population as of the 2006 Canadian Census is just over 6 000.

Geography
The town is located on the northern shore of the Ottawa River, the Rivière des Mille Îles, and the Lake of Two Mountains, all of which join the Saint Lawrence River, to its south, near the West Island of Montreal Island.

Pointe-Calumet is accessible from the Montreal area and points east from Quebec Autoroute 640, which runs from Laval, Saint-Eustache, Terrebonne, and Repentigny. Quebec Route 344 also runs through the village and links the northern Montreal suburbs as well as the Grenville area, north of Hawkesbury, Ontario. Pointe-Calumet is also located near the Montreal commuter train that runs from Downtown Montreal to Deux-Montagnes.

The town is located within the provincial electoral district of Deux-Montagnes, which also includes the municipality of the same name to its east.

History
Pointe-Calumet was declared a municipality in 1952 after being part of the Saint-Joseph-du-Lac parish where about 30 families were living prior of being a municipality. However, with the presence of numerous beaches nearby, visitors from the Montreal region visited the area on weekends.

Transportation 
Pointe-Calumet is served by routes 80 and 81 of the Exo Laurentides sector from Terminus Saint-Eustache via the Deux-Montagnes station.

Demographics
Population trend:
 Population in 2016: 6428 (2011 to 2016 population change: 0.5%)
 Population in 2011: 6396 (2006 to 2011 population change: -2.7%)
 Population in 2006: 6574 (2001 to 2006 population change: 17.3%)
 Population in 2001: 5604
 Population in 1996: 5443
 Population in 1991: 4482

Private dwellings occupied by usual residents: 2539 (total dwellings: 2636)

Mother tongue:
 English as first language: 4%
 French as first language: 92.3%
 English and French as first language: 1.2%
 Other as first language: 2.5%

Tourist attractions
The town's major attraction is the Super Aqua Club, is one of the biggest waterparks in the province along with the Water Parks at Mont Saint-Sauveur. Opened in 1984, the park contains about 40 attractions. The Beach Club is today the main beach of the area. The town is also located beside the Oka National Park as well as beside the village of Oka.

Local government

Municipal council:
 Jacques Seguin, mayor (retired)
 Jean-Guy Lafaille, councilor (district 1)
 Denis Gravel, councilor (district 2)
 Alexander Tomeo, councilor (district 3)
 Robert Beauchamp, councilor (district 4)
 Normand Clermont, councilor (district 5)
 Marie-Claude Prud'Homme, councilor (district 6)

Education

The Commission scolaire de la Seigneurie-des-Mille-Îles (CSSMI) operates Francophone public schools. The community is zoned to École des Perséides in Pointe-Calumet and École polyvalente Deux-Montagnes in Deux-Montagnes.

The Sir Wilfrid Laurier School Board operates Anglophone schools. Lake of Two Mountains High School in Deux-Montagnes serves this community. Mountainview Elementary School and Saint Jude Elementary School, both in Deux-Montagnes, also serve this community.

See also
 List of municipalities in Quebec
 Oka National Park

References

External links

 Municipality website

Municipalities in Quebec
Incorporated places in Laurentides
Greater Montreal